, known also as Grandizer , is a Japanese animated television series and manga created by Go Nagai. The series is the third entry in the Mazinger series, later relegated into a spinoff series. The series, produced by Toei Doga and Dynamic Planning, is directed by Tomoharu Katsumata and written by Shozo Uehara. It aired on Fuji TV from October 5, 1975, to February 27, 1977. The robot's first appearance in the United States was as a part of the Shogun Warriors line of super robot toys imported in the late 1970s by Mattel, then in Jim Terry's Force Five series.

Plot 
The Vega homeworld has become unstable due to the exploiting of Vegatron, a powerful radioactive ore. Seeking to expand his militaristic empire and find a substitute planet to settle upon, the ruthless King Vega unleashes his armies—composed of flying saucers and giant robotic monsters—and turns first against neighbors such as Fleed, a highly advanced but peaceful world. The once verdant, idyllic Fleed is turned into a radioactive wasteland. Too late, the only known survivor of the royal family, the Crown Prince Duke Fleed, manages to steal the Grendizer, the robotic embodiment of the Fleedian God of War, from the Vegan invaders who plan to use it to spearhead their invasion fleet. Grendizer is a giant monster robot that interfaces with Spacer (Spaizer), a flying saucer that enables the robot to fly.

Fleeing Vegan space by flying at faster than light speed, the Duke enters our solar system and switches course to Earth, making a rough landing in Japan, on the slopes of Mount Fuji. He is befriended by Doctor Umon, a noted scientist who oversees a research laboratory called the Space Science Lab near a small ranch. The kindly Umon takes in the young humanoid alien as his son, under the assumed name of Daisuke, and assists him in hiding Grendizer. Taking the name Daisuke Umon, Duke Fleed works at the ranch run by Danbei Makiba (based on Abashiri Daemon of Go Nagai's manga Abashiri Ikka).

Roughly two years later, Koji Kabuto, after studying abroad, returns to Japan in a flying saucer he personally designed and built, called the TFO. He heads to the Space Science Lab after hearing of multiple sightings of "flying saucers". He plans to contact the aliens if possible and make peace with them. Daisuke, however, scoffs at the notion and fears that these aliens, the Vegans, led by generals Blaki and Gandal, are preparing to attack Earth. Koji ignores his warnings and flies out to meet the incoming saucers, only to discover the horrible truth. In order to save Koji and protect his adoptive homeworld from destruction, Daisuke is forced to return to his true identity as Duke Fleed. He unearths Grendizer from its hiding place under the lab and sets off to fight his enemies.

The Vegans establish a base on the far side of the Moon and start to attack Earth from there. Koji discovers Duke Fleed's true identity and their bitter rivalry soon turns to friendship. The daughter of Danbei Makiba, Hikaru, also discovers Daisuke's secret and becomes a pilot in order to assist him despite his objections. Later on, it is revealed that there were two more survivors from planet Fleed: Duke's younger sister Maria Grace Fleed and a man who had rescued her and fled to Earth, raising her under the guise of her grandfather. Caught in a crossfire between Grendizer and a Vegan beast, he reveals to Maria that she is the last survivor of the royal family of Fleed (under the belief that Duke was killed) before dying from his wounds. Maria swears revenge on Grendizer and its pilot. She tries to ambush Duke, Koji and Hikaru at the Space Science Lab, but the fight is short. Maria's attacks bring Duke's necklace (which is the same as the one she wore) into view and the truth is revealed. The lost siblings are reunited at last and Maria becomes the last addition to the team.

As the conflict nears its end, it is shown that Duke Fleed was engaged to King Vega's daughter, Princess Rubina, prior to the attack on Fleed. When Rubina discovers that planet Fleed is no longer polluted with Vegatron radiation and that her fiancé is alive and well, she rushes to Earth to bring him the good news. Unfortunately, one of King Vega's generals uses this opportunity to ambush Duke Fleed, and Rubina is killed when she takes a shot aimed at Duke. This makes Duke even more determined to wipe out the Vegan menace once and for all.

King Vega decides to gather his remaining forces and make an all-out attack on Earth, destroying the Moon Base to coax his troops into fighting to the end and finally succeed in invading Earth and taking it as their new home planet. Duke and company go out to intercept them in Grendizer and the newly designed space combat Spazers. After a fierce battle, they finally manage to destroy the Vegan mother ship along with King Vega himself. Soon afterwards, Duke and Maria bid a tearful farewell to Earth and their friends and return to help reconstruct planet Fleed.

Production
UFO Robo Grendizer's origins dates back to Uchu Enban Daisenso (宇宙円盤大戦争, Uchū Enban Daisensō), translated and also known as Battlefield of The Space Saucers and The Great Battle of the Flying Saucers, a 1975 animated short film created by Go Nagai and produced by Toei Doga. It is also known as Space Disk War and was also released in Italy under the name UFO Robot Gattaiger-La grande battaglia dei dischi spaziali. It was originally shown along with the short film Great Mazinger tai Getter Robot G: Kuchu Daigekitotsu, also from Toei and Nagai.

Nagai and Dynamic Productions created Grendizer using some of the elements and characters from Daiseno including Duke, the Makiba family, and even Blaki. Some changes were made to make it more original. The most obvious are the changes in design and the addition of characters such as Koji Kabuto and Maria Fleed.

UFO Robot Grendizer was developed to be a sequel to Great Mazinger after the initial concepts of a sequel were rejected by Toei. With the appearance of Uchu Enban Daisenso at the March 1975 Toei Manga Festival a remake was pitched using elements from Mazinger. To breathe new light into the series, the villains of the series were decided to be aliens, a trend that followed in other Toei mecha series while also making Duke a more Blue Blood character with his suit being based on a knight including more romantic elements with its characters and sense of adventure.

Go Nagai, however, at one point stated in an interview that the anime series was considered a fun side project and does not consider Grendizer to be part of the series timeline. This is mainly because he had many disagreements with Toei and Shingo Araki over the direction the show should take as well has Toei not paying him royalties for the show's overseas airings, which culminated in a 1986 court settlement that lead to Toei paying Nagai his royalty earnings. In the end, UFO Robo Grendizer is more of a stand-alone spin-off in the Mazinger universe.

Media

Anime

The series was first aired on Fuji TV from October 5, 1975, to February 27, 1977, replacing Great Mazinger in its initial timeslot. Shunsuke Kikuchi composed the music for the series.

Episodes

Home media

Toei released the entire series in Japan on DVD from May 21 to October 21, 2006. In 2013, following an agreement with Toei, an official "fully remastered and uncensored" DVD release of the complete series is available on French-speaking countries following the controversy regarding the unlicensed DVD releases by Manga Distribution and Déclic Images which resulted to a court ruling to pay €7,200,000 back to Toei. The series has also aired on the French Mangas anime TV channel. The entire Arabic dub is available on Istikana, a paid streaming service that has On-Demand Arab movies and TV shows.

Manga
The manga adaptation was serialized in several magazines in Japan, notably in Akita Shoten's Boken Oh magazine from October 1975 to March 1977. A remake of the series, titled  was serialized in Akita Shoten's Champion Red magazine from September 2014 to July 2015. Only 2 Tankobon volumes were released.

It was originally published as a monthly manga magazine e-manga from Kodansha, from June 2004 to July 2007.

Video games
Characters from the series also appeared in several installments of Banpresto's (now Bandai Namco Entertainment) popular crossover video game series Super Robot Wars, making its debut in the second installment of the franchise, 2nd Super Robot Wars.  In recent years, however, Grendizer has made far less appearances in the mainline games but has recently been making a comeback starting with Super Robot Wars MX.

An Open-world action video game adaptation titled  was announced by French video game publisher Microids in February 2021. The game is being developed by Endroad and set to be release worldwide in O4 2023.

Toys
Japanese Toy company Popy released several toys based on the mechs on the series in the show's initial run in Japan under both the Chogokin and Jumbo Machinder labels, which were later released in the United States in the late 1970s by Mattel as part of the Shogun Warriors line of super robot toys.
The titular mecha is also included in Bandai's line of Soul of Chogokin figures, starting with the GX-04 Grendizer.

Cultural Impact
Grendizer was the second longest running animated Mazinger series in Japan, having 74 episodes. However, it has been criticized about its connection to the other Mazinger series in the franchise, especially with Koji's status as a mere sidekick and giving him a different romantic interest who wasn't Sayaka, as well as the lack of the other Mazinger mechs.

This created the popular assumption that the anime wasn't a success in Japan, especially since the merchandise based on the anime didn't sell as well as the merchandise for both Mazinger Z and Great Mazinger. However, Go Nagai disputes this, saying the anime was actually quite successful in Japan: “It was actually a hit in Japan. Maybe some people thought it was not as popular as Mazinger Z, because Mazinger was super popular.” The average viewership metrics for UFO Robot Grendizer's original Japanese broadcast was around 20.9% audience share across its 74 episodes with a peak share of 27.6% for Episode 21.

Regardless of its disputed success in Japan, Grendizer was one of the first anime programs to be a major success in both Europe and the Arabic regions of the Middle East, and continues to have a strong following in those parts of the world to this day.

In Europe, Grendizer is a major success in France and Italy, known in both countries as Goldorak and Goldrake respectively. In Italy, the Italian dub theme songs were among the best-selling singles of 1978, with the first selling over 700,000 copies and the second selling over 1,000,000 copies. It would also get its own comic series titled Atlas UFO Robot Presenta Goldrake (Atlas UFO Robot Presents Goldrake), whose story diverged even further from the source material. This comic ran for 89 issues and spawned several other similar comic adaptations of anime airing on Italian television at that time.

The French dub titled  was the first anime series to be telecast in France and legend goes that the series was so popular among French viewers that several episodes scored a 100% TV rating. Like the Italian dub, it changed all of the characters’ names and inserted additional songs, although it did translate the series’ original opening and ending themes into French. Some versions of the dub have a completely different theme simply titled "Goldorak", which was sung by Franco-Israeli singer Noam Kaniel. Kaniel's performance earned him unprecedented celebrity status in France; by the time Goldorak  had ended its original run on French TV, its theme song achieved platinum status in France.  The Francophone dub was also one of the first anime programs to be a major success in Canada where it was broadcast on Quebec's TVA network. The show continues to have a strong following, garnering widespread news coverage of its DVD release and return to broadcast TV in Canada. In October 2021 a fully licensed French-language Goldorak graphic novel was released by Editions Kana. According to the creative team, Go Nagai himself gave his blessings to the comics story, which serves as a sequel to the original Toei anime set 10 years after the final episode. The comic has received positive reviews from readers for its detailed art and a story that keeps the spirit of the original series. To coincide with the graphic novel's release, the French postal company, La Poste issued stamps inspired by the anime.

UFO Robot Grendizer Raid was released theatrically as Goldorak and became a hit at the French box office, selling 922,964 tickets upon release in 1979.

In Arab Countries, the show was also extremely popular, first airing in Lebanon on Télé Liban in 1979 under the title مغامرات الفضاء: يوفو - غرندايزر (Moughamarat Al Fada: UFO - Grendizer, Adventures In Space: UFO - Grendizer) before being distributed to most other Arabic speaking regions. Unlike the Italian and French dubs, the Arabic dub retained the characters’ names and kept songs from the Japanese version. Also unlike most other Arabic dubs of anime, the show retained most of its plot details without any alteration or censorship in most Arabic-speaking markets, although some markets—such as Saudi Arabia and the UAE—did censor certain scenes.

The Arabic language version of Grendizer was so popular when it first aired that it spawned several long-running Grendizer comics published for the Arabic market. Many of these were translations of the Italian-produced comics, the most well known of these being for the Lebanese comics anthology ما وراء الكون (Ma'Wara El Koun, Beyond The Universe). The magazine founded by Lebanese publisher Bassat Al Reeh (Flying Carpet) and headed by the company's editor Henry Matthews, published Arabic translations of science fiction comics ranging from one-off short stories to licensed Star Trek, Star Wars, and Marvel superhero comics, as well as TV licensed comics adaptations like Six Million Dollar Man and The Bionic Woman. Grendizer didn't make its appearance until the fifth issue, but was so popular that it became the top feature on the title, running for 140 issues. It later spawned its own comic series titled مغامرات غرندايزر (Moghamarat Grendizer, Grendizer Adventures) that ran for over 70 issues. The series' popularity continues on in the region, as Arab News journalist Hala Tashkandi stated; “Grendizer memorabilia still sell like hot cakes in the region, and its popularity has barely declined.” Lebanese pop star Sami Clark, who sang the Arabic version of the opening and ending in the Arabic dub, had frequently sung the theme in his concerts, including an orchestral rendering in 2018 
. Clark also performed a duet with the singer of the original Japanese themes, Issao Sasaki, at the 2019 Saudi Anime Expo. There's even a store in Kuwait that started out mainly selling Grendizer merchandise, before expanding to selling other anime merchandise. In 2016, a Kuwaiti volunteer group made a Grendizer mural in Kuwait City during Urban Culture Week. Karim El Mufti, a professor of political science, said in his article about the anime, "UFO Robo Grendizer has surpassed the initial expectations of its producers. Although the conversion works of the original Japanese version into Arabic had kept the Japanese phonetics, sites and cultural references, the cartoon has actually blossomed into a life of its own. As such, the domestication process of this character and of its whole narrative set was intimately connected to the Arab context and politics at the inception moment of the series,  thus mirroring the deep preoccupations of the generations of that time. High exposure to violence, aggression, and injustice in the Middle East had established a hospitable environment for the super-powerful resistance figure and pro-justice hero." Go Nagai stated in an interview with Arab News that he believes the geopolitical climate in the Arab world played a big role in Grendizer becoming popular in Arab regions.

Grendizer only had limited success in the United States, where it was one of 5 mecha shows included in the 1980 TV anthology Force Five. The series was renamed Grandizer for the American market, and only had 26 episodes, which were run out of order. Despite the low episode count, it enjoys a small but dedicated cult following among East Coast American viewers who saw the show as children, as well as children who grew up with military families because Force Five was frequently aired on the cable TV feed of US military installations in Europe. This was also the version of the show broadcast in the United Kingdom, India, and the Philippines (though an earlier local Filipino English dub of the show existed before it was taken off the air by orders of the Ferdinand Marcos regime).

See also
 UFO Robot Grendizer vs. Great Mazinger
 Grendizer, Getter Robot G, Great Mazinger: Kessen! Daikaijuu

References

External links 
  at Toei Animation 
 
 

1970s animated short films
1975 anime films
1975 anime television series debuts
1975 manga
1976 anime films
1976 manga
1977 Japanese television series endings
Fictional robots
Akita Shoten manga
Alien invasions in television
Anime short films
Television series about robots
Fuji TV original programming
Shunsuke Kikuchi
Super robot anime and manga
Toei Animation television
Fiction set around Vega